The chairman of the State Administration Council is the head of Myanmar's ruling military junta, established in the 2021 coup d'état. Min Aung Hlaing is the current holder of the office, and also serves as the prime minister of the Provisional Government.

Background
On 1 February 2021, the military of Myanmar launched a coup on the democratically elected members of Myanmar's ruling party, the National League for Democracy. The leader of the coup, Min Aung Hlaing, became the de facto leader of the state after the coup. A day after the coup, Min Aung Hlaing formalized his leadership by forming the State Administration Council, in which he assumed office as the chairman.

Powers
As Min Aung Hlaing concurrently held office as the commander-in-chief of the Myanmar Armed Forces, he has the right to exercise legislative, judicative, and executive powers. His chairman office exercises his legislative power.

Chairman

Vice Chairman

The vice chairman of the State Administration Council is the junta's second-ranked official.

See also
 Politics of Myanmar
 President of Myanmar
 Vice President of Myanmar
 Prime Minister of Myanmar
 State Counsellor of Myanmar
 Ministry of State Counsellor’s Office
 Supreme leader
Council of State

References

Government of Myanmar
Military dictatorships
Military history of Myanmar
2020s in Myanmar
2021 in military history
2021 establishments in Myanmar